Gerson Santos da Silva (born 20 May 1997), simply known as Gerson, is a Brazilian professional footballer who plays as a midfielder for Campeonato Brasileiro Série A club Flamengo and the Brazil national team.

Club career

Fluminense

Born in Belford Roxo, Rio de Janeiro, Gerson finished his formation with Fluminense. On 28 August 2014, he was promoted to the main squad, being included in the club's 22-man list for that year's Copa Sudamericana.

On 12 November 2014, Gerson signed a new five-year deal with the club. He was subsequently linked to Barcelona, Atlético Madrid and Juventus throughout the year, but nothing came of it.

Gerson made his senior debut on 22 February 2015, coming on as a second-half substitute in a 0–1 home loss against Vasco for the Campeonato Carioca championship. He scored his first goal for the club on 8 March, netting his team's second in a 3–1 home win against Botafogo. He appeared in 12 matches during the tournament, scoring four goals. Gerson made his Série A debut on 9 May 2015, starting in a 1–0 home win against Joinville.

Roma
After being linked to several top European clubs in the winter of 2015–16, Gerson sealed a move to Italian club Roma on 4 January for around €15m.

On 27 November 2016, Gerson started his first game with Roma against Pescara.

Loan to Fiorentina
On 20 July 2018, Gerson joined Fiorentina on loan until 30 June 2019.

Flamengo
On 12 July 2019 Gerson signed with Brazilian club Flamengo through 2023. The €11.8m (R$49.7m) transfer fee made Gerson the most expensive Brazilian player ever signed by a Brazilian club at the time.

At the beginning of the 2021 season Gerson won the 2021 Supercopa do Brasil, the 2021 Campeonato Carioca and helped Flamengo qualify for the round of 16 at the 2021 Copa Libertadores before moving to Olympique de Marseille ahead of the 2021-22 European season.

Marseille

On 9 June 2021, French club Olympique de Marseille announced that they reached an agreement in principle with Flamengo for the transfer of Gerson. Following a successful medical examination, he signed a five-year contract with the club, and was presented with the number 8 jersey on 1 July.

Return to Flamengo
On 31 December 2022 Flamengo announced an agreement with Olympique de Marseille to transfer back Gerson in a €15m transfer fee.

International career
On 27 November 2014, Gerson was called up to the Brazil under-20s for the 2015 South American Youth Football Championship. He made his debut for the side on 15 January 2015, starting in a 2–1 win against Chile, and appeared in all matches during the tournament.

In November 2019 senior national team coach Tite stated that he was monitoring Gerson for a callup, having regretted not giving the player a call-up earlier that year. In December, Gerson asked not to be called for Brazil under-23 team to the South American qualifying tournament for the Summer Olympics to be held in January, citing fatigue after an intense season with Flamengo.

Gerson's decision was met with backlash internally at CBF and it has been rumored that his absence from the national team is due to that previous request, refusing the call-up for the under-23 team. However, his continued form with Flamengo, winning the Brasileirao, Supercopa, Recopa and Cariocao in 2020, and the Supercopa and Taça Guanabara in 2021, has led to more requests from fans and the media for his call-up, and manager Tite now seems open to give him a convocation.

In May 2021, Gerson was summoned to the Brazil under-23 team for friendlies against Cape Verde and Serbia the following month, ahead of the 2020 Olympics. On 17 June 2021, Gerson was named in the Brazil squad for the 2020 Summer Olympics. On 2 July, however, it was announced that Marseille had vetoed his participation in the tournament.

He was first called up to and made his debut for the senior team on 2 September 2021 in a World Cup qualifier against Chile, a 1–0 away victory. He substituted Bruno Guimarães at half-time.

Career statistics

Club

International

Honours
Fluminense
Primeira Liga: 2016

Flamengo
Copa Libertadores: 2019
Recopa Sudamericana: 2020
Campeonato Brasileiro Série A: 2019, 2020
Supercopa do Brasil: 2020, 2021
Campeonato Carioca: 2020, 2021
Individual
Campeonato Brasileiro Série A Team of the Year: 2019, 2020
Bola de Prata: 2019, 2020
Campeonato Carioca Team of the Year: 2020, 2021

References

External links
 Fluminense official profile 
 
 

1997 births
Living people
Sportspeople from Rio de Janeiro (state)
Association football midfielders
Brazilian footballers
Brazilian expatriate footballers
Campeonato Brasileiro Série A players
Serie A players
Ligue 1 players
Fluminense FC players
A.S. Roma players
ACF Fiorentina players
CR Flamengo footballers
Olympique de Marseille players
Copa Libertadores-winning players
Brazil under-20 international footballers
Brazil international footballers
Brazilian expatriate sportspeople in Italy
Expatriate footballers in Italy
Brazilian expatriate sportspeople in France
Expatriate footballers in France
People from Bedford Roxo